Ian Hultquist is an American composer and musician. Hultquist is best known for his score for The Diabolical and for being a founding member of the band Passion Pit. He is also known for his works on movies such as  Mommy Dead and Dearest, The First Monday in May, My Blind Brother and Memoria.

Career

After graduating from Berklee College of Music, Hultquist became a founding member of the indie band Passion Pit in 2007 and acted as their music director while on tour. This pulled him away from film composing for awhile and in 2010 he and his wife Sofia Hultquist created their side project 'Aislyn'.

In 2013 he was introduced to documentary filmmaker Andrew Rossi who quickly hired him to score his film Ivory Tower. Around the same time, while on set for a Passion Pit music video, Hultquist would also meet and befriend actor David Dastmalchian, who would then hire Hultquist to score his feature film 'Animals'.

From there, Hultquist's composing career burgeoned as he began to compose music for films at SXSW and Sundance. In October 2014, he officially left Passion Pit.

Personal life
Hultquist is married to fellow composer and musician Sofia Hultquist.

Works and awards 
Hultquist has composed dozens of soundtracks and film scores for both film and TV. He is best known for scoringThe Diabolical and for being a founding member of the band Passion Pit. He is also known for his works on movies such as Mommy Dead and Dearest, The First Monday in May, My Blind Brother and Memoria. He also composed score for Apple TV+'s Dickinson with Drum & Lace.

References

External links 
 
 

American film score composers
American television composers
American indie pop musicians
Living people
American male film score composers
Male television composers
1985 births
Berklee College of Music alumni